Škocjan is a settlement on the outskirts of Koper in the Littoral region of Slovenia.

Name
The name of the settlement was changed from Sveti Tomaž (literally, 'Saint Thomas') to Škocjan in 1955. The name was changed on the basis of the 1948 Law on Names of Settlements and Designations of Squares, Streets, and Buildings as part of efforts by Slovenia's postwar communist government to remove religious elements from toponyms.

References

External links
Škocjan on Geopedia

Populated places in the City Municipality of Koper